The 1997 Marbella Open was a men's Association of Tennis Professionals tennis tournament held in Marbella, Spain. It was the third edition of the tournament and was held from 8 September until 15 September 1997. First-seeded Álbert Costa won the singles title.

Finals

Singles

 Álbert Costa defeated  Alberto Berasategui 6–3, 6–2
 It was Costa's 2nd title of the year and the 6th of his career.

Doubles

 Karim Alami /  Julián Alonso defeated  Alberto Berasategui /  Jordi Burillo 4–6, 6–3, 6–0
 It was Alami's only title of the year and the 3rd of his career. It was Alonso's 2nd title of the year and the 2nd of his career.

References

External links 
 ITF tournament edition details

 
Marbella Open
Marbella